Holy Name School or Holy Names School may refer to:

Canada
 Holy Name of Mary Catholic Secondary School, Brampton, Ontario
 Holy Name of Mary College School, Mississauga, Ontario
 Holy Names High School (Windsor, Ontario), Windsor, Ontario

United States
 Holy Name Central Catholic High School, Worcester, Massachusetts
 Holy Name High School, Parma Heights, Ohio
 Holy Name High School (Reading, Pennsylvania), Reading, Pennsylvania
 Holy Name Parish School, West Roxbury, Massachusetts
 Holy Names Academy, Seattle, Washington
 Holy Names High School (Oakland, California), Oakland, California
 Holy Name of Jesus Catholic School, Indialantic, Florida
 Holy Name School, Birmingham, Michigan